Copper ibuprofenate is a chemical complex consisting of copper(II) and the chelate form of the anti-inflammatory drug ibuprofen. The compound is prepared by the reaction of sodium ibuprofenate with copper(II) sulfate.

It has been suggested that copper complexes of anti-inflammatory drugs are more active than the parent drug and produce fewer gastrointestinal side-effects. In 2008, a United States patent was issued for the utilization of ibuprofenate complexes (including copper ibuprofenate) as a wood preservative.

References

Further reading

Copper(II) compounds
Nonsteroidal anti-inflammatory drugs